Westcott is an extinct town in northwestern Phelps County, in the U.S. state of Missouri. The community lies on Missouri Route C approximately three quarters of a mile east of Tick Creek and three miles north-northwest of Doolittle and I-44.

A post office called Westcott was established in 1893, and remained in operation until 1906. It is unknown why the name Westcott was applied to this community.

References

Ghost towns in Missouri
Former populated places in Phelps County, Missouri